The Nouvelle Biographie Générale ("New General Biography"), was a 46-volume, French-language, biographical reference work, compiled between 1852 and 1866 by Ferdinand Hoefer, French physician and lexicographer.

The first nine volumes were entitled Nouvelle Biographie Universelle ("New Universal Biography").

Notes

External links

The volumes of the Nouvelle Biographie Générale (pub. Firmin Didot fréres etc.) in various file formats in the Internet Archive:

A list of contributors appears at the end of volume 46, the final volume.

1853 non-fiction books
French biographical dictionaries
19th-century French literature
Online person databases